Ronald Flynn Lewis (born 1966) is a former three-star general in the United States Army, retroactively demoted to brigadier general. He last served as special assistant to Vice Chief of Staff of the United States Army Daniel B. Allyn, and prior to that was the senior military assistant to United States Secretary of Defense Ash Carter from April to November 2015.

Early life and education

Lewis was born in Kittery, Maine to Richard and Emma Lewis, the former being a retired United States Air Force sergeant with 12 years of military service. He was raised in Chicago, Illinois and graduated from Vanderpoel Elementary School and later Mendel Catholic Preparatory High School before proceeding to West Point in 1983. He graduated from West Point with a Bachelor of Science in mechanical engineering. Lewis was a student in the United States Naval War College from 2006 to 2007, where he received a master's degree in national security and strategic studies.

Military career

Lewis was commissioned into the Army as a second lieutenant in May 1987. Notable individuals in his class include Edward M. Daly (commander of United States Army Materiel Command), David Mikolaities (adjutant general of New Hampshire) and John H. Moellering Jr. (son of retired general John H. Moellering). Initially intending to become an infantry officer, a mentor inspired him to join the aviation branch instead.

Lewis had three combat tours in Iraq and Afghanistan as part of the 101st Airborne Division. His command assignments include being commander of the 159th Combat Aviation Brigade from 2008 to 2012. In Afghanistan, Lewis was deputy commanding general for support of the 101st Airborne Division, dual-hatted as deputy commanding general for support of Regional Command East from 2012 to 2014.

Lewis later became military assistant to Ash Carter three times - when Carter was Under Secretary of Defense for Acquisition, Technology and Logistics, Deputy Secretary of Defense and finally Secretary of Defense. He also served as a member of Carter's SecDef transition team, introducing him to key senators and preparing him for his Senate confirmation hearing. He was chief of Army public affairs from 2014 to 2015, promoting to major general on January 7, 2014.

General James C. McConville was his commanding officer on all three of his combat deployments. McConville praised Lewis as "extremely competent" and "exactly the type of leader that we want at the highest levels of the Army". One of Lewis's mentors, former Army vice chief of staff Richard A. Cody commented that his protégé was an unambitious but principled officer, not "worried about the next rung on the ladder" but "worried about doing the right thing every day."

Retirement and demotion

On November 12, 2015, Lewis was relieved as senior military assistant to Secretary Carter and re-assigned as a special assistant to then Vice Chief of Staff of the Army Daniel B. Allyn. Carter cited "alleged misconduct" as the reason for his firing and directed the Inspector General to investigate the matter. Due to no longer holding a three-star position, Lewis was demoted to major general.

The IG investigation concluded in October 2016 that Lewis had demonstrated conduct "unbecoming an officer and a gentleman on multiple occasions" while serving as Carter's military assistant. Lewis was also determined to have made false statements to the Department in service of other acts of misconduct, claiming his government credit card had been stolen while on duty in South Korea.

As a result of the investigation, Lewis was given an official reprimand by General Allyn and by direction of then Army Secretary Eric Fanning demoted to the retirement rank of brigadier general, which was determined to be the last rank in which he satisfactorily served. His retirement pay was summarily slashed by $20,000, leaving him approximately $80,000 after taxes in his first year of retirement.

Personal life

Lewis is married with two children, including a son named R.J., who in 2015 was a student as East-West University in Chicago.

Awards and decorations

In addition to the below awards, Lewis is also the 2013 recipient of the Army Stars and Stripes Award, which he received in February 2013 during the 27th annual Black Engineer of the Year Awards Global Competitiveness Conference.

References

Living people
1966 births
People from Kittery, Maine
Military personnel from Chicago
United States Military Academy alumni
Naval War College alumni
United States Army personnel of the Iraq War
United States Army personnel of the War in Afghanistan (2001–2021)
Recipients of the Defense Distinguished Service Medal
Recipients of the Legion of Merit
Recipients of the Distinguished Flying Cross (United States)
African-American United States Army personnel
United States Army aviators
United States Army generals